P. dioica  may refer to:
 Phytolacca dioica, the ombú, a massive evergreen herb species growing as a tree native to the Pampas of South America
 Pimenta dioica, the allspice, Jamaica pepper, kurundu, myrtle pepper, pimenta or newspice, a mid-canopy tree species native to the Greater Antilles, southern Mexico and Central America
 Polyscias dioica, a flowering plant species in the genus Polyscias

See also